The 1971–72 Liga Española de Baloncesto season was the 16th season of the Liga Española de Baloncesto and was played between 9 October 1971 and 27 February 1972. The season ended with Real Madrid winning their 14th title.

Overview before the season
12 teams joined the league, including two promoted from the 1970–71 Segunda División.

Promoted from 1970–71 Segunda División
Vallehermoso
Pineda

Teams and locations
<onlyinclude>

Regular season

League table

Relegation playoffs

|}

Statistics leaders

Points

References

ACB.com  
Linguasport 
FEB 

Liga Española de Baloncesto (1957–1983) seasons
    
Spanish